Governor Dudley may refer to:

Joseph Dudley (1647–1720), Governor of the Province of Massachusetts Bay from 1702 to 1715
Thomas Dudley (1576–1653), 3rd, 7th, 11th, and 14th Governor of the Massachusetts Bay Colony at various points between 1634 and 1651